Henrique Jocú (born 9 September 2001) is a professional footballer who plays as a midfielder for Portimonense. Born in Guinea Bissau, Jocú is a former youth international for Portugal.

Playing career
On 4 April 2020, Jocú signed his first professional contract with Benfica B. Jocú made his professional debut with Benfica B in a 3–2 LigaPro win over Cova da Piedade on 25 November 2020.

On 15 July 2021 he signed a three-year contract with Portimonense.

References

External links
 
 
 

2001 births
Living people
Sportspeople from Bissau
Portuguese footballers
Portugal youth international footballers
Bissau-Guinean footballers
Bissau-Guinean emigrants to Portugal
Association football midfielders
S.L. Benfica B players
Portimonense S.C. players
Primeira Liga players
Liga Portugal 2 players